James L. Perry is a career academic, American professor, and co-editor of the Asia Pacific Journal of Public Administration.

Perry, who has only worked in academia, began his career in 1974 at University of California, Irvine.  After 11 years at UC – Irvine, which included positions as Associate Dean and Doctoral Program Coordinator, Perry began his tenure at Indiana University Paul H. O'Neill School of Public and Environmental Affairs (O'Neill School).  During his 28 years at the O'Neill School he served as a visiting professor at Chinese University of Hong Kong on a Fulbright Scholarship, visiting professor at the Robert M. La Follette School of Public Affairs, and distinguished visiting professor at Yonsei University in South Korea on a second Fulbright Scholarship.  He has held numerous leadership positions during his tenure at Indiana University including Director of Indiana University American Democracy Project, Associate Dean at Indiana University-Purdue University Indianapolis, Chair of Policy and Administration Faculty, and Director of the Joint PhD program in public policy. From 1998 to 2000 Perry served as the editor-in-chief of the Journal of Public Affairs Education. He also served as editor-in-chief of Public Administration Review between 2012 and 2017, and is currently the co-editor of Asia Pacific Journal of Public Administration. Perry won the 2008 Dwight Waldo Award (presented by American Society for Public Administration) and the John Gaus Award (American Political Science Association) in 2017 and the 2018 Routledge Prize for outstanding contributions to public management research (International Research Society for Public Management). He is a Fellow of the National Academy of Public Administration.

Bibliography
Managing Organizations to Sustain Passion for Public Service (2021)  
Public Service and Good Governance for the Twenty-first Century (2020)Handbook of Public Administration, 3rd Edition (2015)
Motivation in Public Management: The Call of Public Service (2008) 
Civic Service: What Difference Does It Make? (2004)

References

External links
 https://oneill.indiana.edu/faculty-research/directory/profiles/faculty/full-time/perry-james.html

Indiana University faculty
Writers from Bloomington, Indiana
People from Two Rivers, Wisconsin
Writers from Wisconsin
Public administration scholars
1948 births
Living people
University of California, Irvine faculty
Academic journal editors
Fulbright alumni